The 2013–14 NCAA Division I women's ice hockey season begin in October, 2013, and ended with the 2014 NCAA Division I Women's Ice Hockey Tournament's championship game on March 23, 2014.

Offseason

Exhibition

CIS Exhibition

News and notes

September

October

November

December
On December 7, 2013, Christine Bestland of the Mercyhurst Lakers logged the 200th point of her NCAA career in an 8-0 victory against Penn State.

January

February

Regular season

Awards and honors

Patti Kazmaier Award
Winner: Jamie Lee Rattray (F), Clarkson Golden Knights

Finalists
Hannah Brandt (F), Minnesota Golden Gophers
Jillian Saulnier (F), Cornell Big Red
Top-10 Finalists

 Erin Ambrose (D), Clarkson Golden Knights
 Brittany Ammerman (F), Wisconsin Badgers
 Kelly Babstock (F), Quinnipiac Bobcats
 Christine Bestland (F), Mercyhurst Lakers
 Rachael Bona (F), Minnesota Golden Gophers
 Sarah Lefort (F), Boston University Terriers
 Emerance Maschmeyer (G), Harvard Crimson

Source:

AHCA Coach of the Year
 Brad Frost, Minnesota

All-American selections
Players selected by the American Hockey Coaches Association (AHCA).

First team

 Goaltender: Alex Rigsby, Wisconsin Badgers

 Defense
 Erin Ambrose, Clarkson Golden Knights
 Rachel Ramsey, Minnesota Golden Gophers
Forwards
Hannah Brandt, Minnesota Golden Gophers
Jamie Lee Rattray, Clarkson Golden Knights
Jillian Saulnier, Cornell Big Red

Second team
Goaltender: Emerance Maschmeyer, Harvard Crimson
Defence
Alyssa Gagliardi, Cornell Big Red
Milica McMillen, Minnesota Golden Gophers
Forwards
Sarah Lefort, Boston University Terriers
Kelly Babstock, Quinnipiac Bobcats
Christine Bestland, Mercyhurst Lakers

See also
National Collegiate Women's Ice Hockey Championship
2013–14 CHA women's ice hockey season
2013–14 ECAC women's ice hockey season
2013–14 Hockey East women's ice hockey season
2013–14 WCHA women's ice hockey season

References

 
NCAA
NCAA
NCAA
NCAA Division I women's ice hockey seasons